Xerocampylaea is a genus of gastropods belonging to the family Hygromiidae.

The species of this genus are found in the Balkans.

Species:

Xerocampylaea erjaveci 
Xerocampylaea waldemari 
Xerocampylaea zelebori

References

Hygromiidae